Orthogonius ovatulus is a species of ground beetle in the subfamily Orthogoniinae. It was described by Ming-Yi Tian and Thierry Deuve in 2003.

References

ovatulus
Beetles described in 2003